Chợ Lầu is a township and capital of Bắc Bình District, Bình Thuận Province, Vietnam.

References

Populated places in Bình Thuận province
District capitals in Vietnam
Townships in Vietnam